Balandar-e Sofla (also Romanized as Bālandar-e Soflá; also known as Bālandar) is a village in Cheshmeh Kabud Rural District, in the Central District of Harsin County, Kermanshah Province, Iran. At the 2006 census, its population was 129, in 23 families.

References 

Populated places in Harsin County